Maria Uladzimirauna Kadobina (Łacinka: Maryja Uladzimirauna Kadobina; , Mariya Vladimirovna Kadobina; born 4 February 1997 in Minsk) is a Belarusian group rhythmic gymnast. She is the 2014 World Championships group all-around bronze medalist.

Career 
As a junior, Kadobina competed as an individual gymnast. She was member of the Belarusian Team (together with teammates Katsiaryna Halkina and Elena Bolotina that competed at the 2012 European Junior Championships where Team Belarus won the Team silver medal, she won another silver clubs final.

In 2013 season, Kadobina debuted as a senior, she competed at the 2013 Grand Prix Final in Berlin and finished 9th in all-around. She qualified to three event finals (ball, clubs, ribbon) and won bronze in ribbon.

In 2014, she was a member of the Belarusian group that competed at the 2014 European Championships, however they finished a distant 17th place in all-around finals after 3 mistakes from their 3 Balls + 2 Ribbons, the Group had performed under Khachaturian's "Sabre Dance" in their 2 Ribbons + 3 Balls routine, but had to change the exercise under a different music 2 weeks before the start of the event in Baku. Kadobina was with the Belarusian Group where on September 5–7, at the 2014 World Cup series in Kazan, they won silver in Group all-around. Kadobina was member of the Belarusian Group that competed at the 2014 World Championships in Izmir, Turkey, they won 3 bronze medals in Group all-around, 10 Clubs and 3 Balls + 2 Ribbons Final.

In 2015, Kadobina was member of the Belarusian Group that won gold in 6 Clubs / 2 Hoops at the 2015 European Games, the Belarusian group also won bronze in the all-around. At the 2015 World Cup series in Kazan, Kadobina with the Belarusian Group won silver medals in Group all-around and 2 Hoops / 6 Clubs, they won bronze in 5 Ribbons.

References

External links
 
 

1997 births
Living people
Belarusian rhythmic gymnasts
European Games gold medalists for Belarus
European Games medalists in gymnastics
European Games bronze medalists for Belarus
Gymnasts at the 2015 European Games
Medalists at the Rhythmic Gymnastics World Championships
Medalists at the Rhythmic Gymnastics European Championships
Gymnasts from Minsk